This is a list of French television related events from 1977.

Events
6 March - Marie Myriam is selected to represent France at the 1977 Eurovision Song Contest with her song "L'oiseau et l'enfant". She is selected to be the twenty-first French Eurovision entry during a national final.
7 May - France wins the 22nd Eurovision Song Contest in London, United Kingdom. The winning song is "L'oiseau et l'enfant", performed by Marie Myriam.

Debuts
 16 September - Téléfoot

Television shows

1940s
Le Jour du Seigneur (1949–present)

1950s
La Piste aux étoiles (1956-1978)

1960s
La Tête et les Jambes (1960-1978)
Les Dossiers de l'écran (1967-1991)
Monsieur Cinéma (1967-1980)
Les Animaux du monde (1969-1990)
Alain Decaux raconte (1969-1987)

1970s
Aujourd'hui Madame (1970-1982)
30 millions d'amis (1976-2016)
Les Jeux de 20 Heures (1976-1987)

Ending this year

Births
2 January - Christophe Beaugrand, television presenter & journalist
30 November - Virginie Guilhaume, television presenter

Deaths

See also
1977 in France
List of French films of 1977